The 2001 IIHF World U18 Championships were held in Heinola, Helsinki, and Lahti, Finland. The championships ran between April 12 and April 22, 2001. Games were played at the Heinolan Jäähalli in Heinola, the Helsinki Ice Hall in Helsinki, and the Lahden Jäähalli in Lahti. Russia defeated Switzerland 6-2 in the final to win the gold medal, with Finland defeating the Czech Republic 2-1 to capture the bronze medal.

Championship results

Preliminary round

Group A

Results

Group B

Results

Relegation Round

Note: The following matches from the preliminary round carry forward to the relegation round:
 April 12, 2001:  3-4 
 April 16, 2001:  10-1 

Ukraine was relegated. However with Canada entering the tournament for 2002, Ukraine was re-instated to top level as the tournament was expanded to 12 teams for a year.

Results

Final round

Quarterfinals

Semifinals

Fifth place game

Bronze medal game

Gold medal game

Final standings

 were supposed to be relegated to Division I for the 2002 IIHF World U18 Championships, however with the late addition of  it was decided to temporarily expand the tournament to twelve teams.

Scoring leaders

Goaltending leaders
(Minimum 60 minutes played)

Division I

First round

Final round 

Division II

First round

Finals 

Division III

First round

Final 

References

External links
Official results and statistics from the International Ice Hockey Federation
Championship

IIHF World U18 Championships
IIHF World U18 Championships
World
International ice hockey competitions hosted by Finland
International sports competitions in Helsinki
April 2001 sports events in Europe
2000s in Helsinki